Priceville is a Canadian community in the community of Upper Miramichi in Northumberland County, New Brunswick.

Home of the McNamee-Priceville Footbridge, and many fishing pools.

History

Priceville New Brunswick was founded by John Price in the early 1800s. It was occupied by Native Americans before that.

Notable people

See also
List of communities in New Brunswick

References

Over the Portage: Early History of the Upper Miramichi-W.R McKinnon

Communities in Northumberland County, New Brunswick